Port of Marseille may refer to:

Marseille-Fos Port
Old Port of Marseille